Streptomyces nodosus is a bacterial species in the genus Streptomyces.

Uses 
Streptomyces nodosus is used to produce amphotericin B.

Saquayamycins (saquayamycins A, B, C and D) are antibiotics of the aquayamycin group found in S. nodosus cultures broth.

References

Further reading

External links 

Type strain of Streptomyces nodosus at BacDive -  the Bacterial Diversity Metadatabase

nodosus
Bacteria described in 1961